The Fields may refer to:

The Fields (film), a horror film starring Cloris Leachman and Tara Reid
The Fields (novel), a 1946 novel by Conrad Richter
The Fields (2013 novel), a 2013 novel by Kevin Maher
The Fields (album), a 1996 album by jazz saxophonist Glenn Spearman
Texas Killing Fields (film), also known as The Fields, a 2011 crime film

See also
Fields (disambiguation)
Field (disambiguation)
The Field (disambiguation)